The Expats is a novel by Chris Pavone which was originally published by Crown Publishing Group (a subsidiary of Random House) on 6 March 2012, and in 2013, won the Anthony Award and the Edgar Award for Best First Novel.

References

External links
 Just a Mom With Play Dates (and a Beretta) featured on The New York Times
 As reviewed on The Guardian
 Chris Pavone’s ‘The Expats’: Sophisticated, yet sometimes silly, spy tale featured on The Washington Post
 As listed on Barnes & Noble

2012 American novels
Anthony Award-winning works
American crime novels
Edgar Award-winning works
Crown Publishing Group books